Little Children is the second album by the English rock band Billy J. Kramer & The Dakotas. It was released by Imperial Records in the United States in 1964. There never was a British version.

Track listing

Side 1

 Little Children (J. Leslie McFarland/Mort Shuman) 2:46
 Da Doo Ron Ron (Phil Spector/Jeff Barry/Ellie Greenwich) 1:52
 Dance With Me (Glick/Lobish/Naham/Treadwell) 2:14
 Pride (Madera/White) 2:20
 I Know (Martin/Wooler) 2:05
 They Remind Me Of You (Maxfield/McDonald) 2:19

Side 2

 Do You Want to Know a Secret? (McCartney/Lennon) 2:01
 Bad To Me (John Lennon/Paul McCartney) 2:18
 I'll Keep You Satisfied (John Lennon/Paul McCartney) 2:04
 Great Balls Of Fire (Otis Blackwell, Jack Hammer) 1:44
 It's Up To You (Fuller) 2:47
 Tell Me Girl (Smith) 2:47

External links
Review by Richie Unterberger

1964 albums